Kevin Rigby (born 4 July 1942) is a former field hockey player from New Zealand, who was a member of the national men's team that finished ninth at the 1972 Summer Olympics in Munich.

References

External links
 
 

New Zealand male field hockey players
Olympic field hockey players of New Zealand
Field hockey players at the 1972 Summer Olympics
1942 births
Living people